The Colorado Classic is the annual football game between Adams State University and Western Colorado University.

Game results

See also  
 List of NCAA college football rivalry games

References

College football rivalries in the United States
Rocky Mountain Athletic Conference rivalries
Adams State Grizzlies football
Western Colorado Mountaineers football
2016 establishments in Colorado
Recurring sporting events established in 2016